Chloroclystis inductata is a moth of the family Geometridae. It is endemic to New Zealand. It was first described by Francis Walker in 1862. The male of this species can be easily identified by the distinctive 'scalloping' of the hindwings.

The larvae feed on the flowers of various plants.

References

External links

Citizen Science observations

Moths described in 1862
Chloroclystis
Moths of New Zealand
Endemic fauna of New Zealand
Taxa named by Francis Walker (entomologist)
Endemic moths of New Zealand